Drumorama! is an album by American jazz drummer Louis Bellson featuring performances recorded in 1957 for the Verve label.

Reception

AllMusic awarded the album 3 stars.

Track listing
All compositions by Louis Bellson, except as indicated.
 "A Trip to the Jungle" 	
 "Scene U.S.A." 	
 "Drum Solo" 	
 "Zip" (Richard Rodgers, Lorenz Hart) 
 "Blues in 6/4" 	
 "Heat Wave" (Irving Berlin)	
 "Far Eastern Week-End" 	
 "Continental Fandangle"

Personnel
Louis Bellson – drums
Harry Edison - trumpet 
Juan Tizol - valve trombone
Willie Smith - alto saxophone
Don Abney - piano
Truck Parham - bass
Norman Granz - tambourine

References

1957 albums
Verve Records albums
Louie Bellson albums
Albums produced by Norman Granz